Ban Zhao (45 or 49 – c. 117/120 CE), courtesy name Huiban, was a Chinese historian, philosopher, and politician. She was the first known female Chinese historian and, along with Pamphile of Epidaurus, one of the first known female historians. She completed her brother Ban Gu's work on the history of the Western Han, the Book of Han. She also wrote Lessons for Women, an influential work on women's conduct. She also had great interest in astronomy and mathematics and wrote poems, commemorative writings, argumentations, commentaries, essays and several longer works, not all of which survive. She became China's most famous female scholar and an instructor of Taoist sexual practices for the imperial family. Ban Zhao is depicted in the Wu Shuang Pu (無雙譜, Table of Peerless Heroes) by Jin Guliang.

Family

Ban Zhao was born in Anling, near modern Xianyang, Shaanxi province. At age fourteen, she married a local resident named Cao Shishu and was called in the court by the name as Venerable Madame Cao. Her husband died when she was still young. She never remarried, instead of devoting her life to scholarship. She was the daughter of the famous historian Ban Biao and younger sister of the general Ban Chao and of historian Ban Gu. She was also the grandniece of the notable scholar and poet Consort Ban.

Work

Ban Zhao contributed greatly to the completion and transmission of Hanshu (漢書, literally the "Book of the [Former] Han"), the official dynastic history of the Western Han. After Ban Gu was imprisoned and died in 92 because of his association with the family of Empress Dowager Dou, Ban Zhao helped finish the work by making up for the missing part of the Babiao (八表 Eight Tables). She added the genealogy of the mother of the emperor, providing much information which was not usually kept. Later, Ma Xu added a treatise on astronomy, making Hanshu a complete work.

Ban Zhao also wrote the Lessons for Women. This treatise on the education of women was dedicated to the daughters in Ban Zhao's family but was circulated immediately at court. It was popular for centuries in China as a guide for women's conduct.

According to the interpretation of classic Western Orientalism, this is a moralistic book, which generally advises women to be compliant and respectful towards the greater purpose of maintaining familial harmony, a highly regarded concept in historical China. According to this interpretation, the book also indicates women should be well-educated so they can better serve their husbands. This interpretation cites translations of passages Ban wrote such as "Even should the husband say he loves something, when the parents-in-law say no, this is called a case of duty leading to disagreement... Nothing is better than obedience which sacrifices personal opinion." 

A minor revisionist theory states that the book is a guide to teach women how to avoid scandal in youth so they can survive long enough to become a powerful dowager.

Modern interpretations of Lessons for Women indicate that it is a founding text of Confucian feminism. One study notes that it establishes a "different concept of agency ... forged out of the powerlessness of individual women, which is familial, communal, indirect, and conferred by others."

She taught Empress Deng Sui and members of the court in the royal library, which gained her political influence. The Empress and concubines gave her the title Gifted one and the empress made her a Lady-in-waiting. As the Empress became regent for the infant Emperor Shang of Han, she often sought the advice of Ban Zhao. In gratitude, the Empress gave both Ban Zhao's sons appointments as officials. Ban Zhao was also a librarian at court, supervising the editorial labors of a staff of assistants and training other scholars in her work. In this capacity, she rearranged and enlarged the Biographies of Eminent Women by Liu Xiang. It is possible that she supervised the copying of manuscripts from bamboo slips and silk onto a recently invented material, paper.

In 113, Ban Zhao's son Cao Cheng was appointed an official in Chenliu Commandery. Ban accompanied him to Chenliu and wrote about the journey in Dong Zheng Fu (which has survived. After her death, her daughter-in-law, née Ding, gathered her works in the three-volume Collected Works of Ban Zhao, but most have been lost.

Legacy

Ban Zhao crater on Venus is named after her.

Ban is one of the polymaths profiled in Waqas Ahmed's 2018 book The Polymath.

Family
 Ban Biao (班彪; 3-54; father)
 Ban Gu (班固; 32–92; eldest brother)
 Ban Chao (班超; 32-102; second brother)
 Ban Xiong (班雄; ?-after 107; Ban Chao's eldest son)
 Ban Shi (班始; ?-130; Ban Chao's second son)
 Ban Yong (班勇; ?-after 127; Ban Chao's youngest son)

See also
Book of Han
Pamphile of Epidaurus, a contemporary female Greco-Roman historian of Roman Egypt

Notes

References

External links
Information on Ban Zhao and her family

49 births
120 deaths
1st-century Chinese historians
1st-century Chinese people
1st-century Chinese philosophers
1st-century Chinese women writers
2nd-century Chinese people
2nd-century Chinese philosophers
2nd-century Chinese women writers
2nd-century Chinese writers
Chinese ladies-in-waiting
Chinese women writers
Chinese women philosophers
Han dynasty historians
Han dynasty politicians from Shaanxi
Historians from Shaanxi
Philosophers from Shaanxi
Politicians from Xianyang
Chinese women historians
Writers from Xianyang
2nd-century Chinese women
1st-century Chinese women
Legendary Chinese people